is a train station on the Kyoto Municipal Subway Tōzai Line in Yamashina-ku, Kyoto, Japan.

Lines
 
 (Station Number: T04)

Layout
The underground station has an island platform with two tracks.

References

Railway stations in Kyoto Prefecture
Railway stations in Japan opened in 1997